Loryma recusata is a species of snout moth in the genus Loryma. It was described by Francis Walker in 1863 and is known from Taiwan, Indonesia (including Sumatra, Borneo and Java), Sri Lanka, India, Thailand, western Malaysia and New Guinea. It has also been recorded from northern Australia and South Africa.

References

Pyralini
Moths described in 1863
Moths of Asia
Moths of Oceania
Moths of Africa